Shohratgarh railway station is located in Shohratgarh town of Siddharthnagar district, Uttar Pradesh. It serves Shohratgarh town. Its code is SOT. It has two platforms. Passenger, DEMU, and Express trains halt here.

Trains

 Gorakhpur–Panvel Express (via Barhni)
 Gorakhpur–Lokmanya Tilak Terminus Express (via Barhni)
 Gorakhpur−Badshahnagar Intercity Express
 Gorakhpur–Sitapur Express (via Barhni)
 Gorakhpur–Bandra Terminus Express (via Barhni)

References 

Lucknow NER railway division
Railway stations in Siddharthnagar district